This page lists the free trade agreements signed by Turkey. In 1995, Turkey signed a customs union with the European Union for goods, excluding agricultural products and services. As of 2018, EU has been Turkey's main trade partner with 50% of its exports and 36% of its imports.

List of agreements

Signed

Future
The following list contains the countries with active trade agreement negotiations.

Replaced agreements with EUCU 
The following agreements have been replaced with European Union–Turkey Customs Union:

Former

References

External links 
 Ministry of Trade (English) / (Turkish)
 Ministry of Foreign Affairs